Sunken battleships are the wrecks of large capital ships built from the 1880s to the mid-20th century that were either destroyed in battle, mined, deliberately destroyed in a weapons test, or scuttled. The battleship, as the might of a nation personified in a warship, played a vital role in the prestige, diplomacy, and military strategies of 20th century nations. The importance placed on battleships also meant massive arms races between the great powers of the 20th century such as the United Kingdom, Germany, Japan, United States, France, Italy, Russia, and the Soviet Union.

The term "battleship" first entered common parlance to describe certain types of ironclad warships in the 1880s, now referred to as pre-dreadnoughts. This first generation, known as the "Dreadnoughts", came to be built in rapid succession in Europe, the Americas, and Japan with ever more tension growing between the major naval powers. However, despite the enormous sums of money and resources dedicated to the construction and maintenance of the increasing number of battleships in the world, they typically saw little combat. With the exception of the naval battles of the Russo-Japanese War and Jutland, which would be one of the last large-scale battles between capital ships, no decisive naval battles between battleships were fought. When the First World War ended in 1918, much of the German High Seas Fleet was escorted to Scapa Flow, where almost all of the fleet was scuttled to prevent its being divided amongst the victorious Allies. Numerous other battleships were scuttled for similar reasoning.

Between the wars, the Washington Naval Treaty and the subsequent London Naval Treaty limited the tonnage and firepower of capital ships permitted to the navies of the world. The United Kingdom and the United States scrapped many of their aging dreadnoughts, while the Japanese began converting battlecruisers into fast battleships in the 1930s. In 1936, Italy and Japan refused to sign the Second London Naval Treaty and withdrew from the earlier treaties, prompting the United States and the United Kingdom to invoke an escalator clause in the treaty that allowed them to increase the displacement and armament of planned ships. The naval combat of World War II saw many battleships belonging to the various nations destroyed as air power began to be realized as being crucial to naval warfare, rather than massive capital ships. As the battleship began to fall out of favor, some captured capital ships were decommissioned, stripped, and deliberately sunk in nuclear weapons tests.

Losses 
Much like battlecruisers, battleships typically sank with large loss of life if and when they were destroyed in battle. Battleships also proved to be very vulnerable to mines, as was evidenced in the Russo-Japanese War and both World Wars. After the Battle of Port Arthur, a number of Russian and Japanese vessels were struck by mines and either sank or were scuttled to prevent their capture. Torpedoes were also very capable of sinking battleships. Barham could not make an attempt to dodge the incoming torpedoes and sank with 862 fatalities as a result of several magazine explosions that occurred after she had initially been hit by U-331s torpedoes.

Although mines and torpedoes constantly threatened the battleship's dominance, it was the refinement of aerial technology and tactics that led to the replacement of the battleship with the aircraft carrier as the most important naval vessel. Initially, the large scale use of aircraft in naval combat was underrated and the idea that they could destroy battleships was dismissed. Still, the United States and the Japanese Empire experimented with offensive roles for aircraft carriers in their fleets. One pioneer of aviation in a naval role was US Army General Billy Mitchell, who commandeered  for testing of his theory in July 1921. Though these tests did not impress his contemporaries, they forced the US Navy to begin diverting some of its budget towards researching the matter further. The belief that the aircraft carrier was junior to the battleship began to evaporate when the Imperial Japanese Navy, in a surprise attack, nearly destroyed the United States Pacific Fleet while it was at anchor at Pearl Harbor on 7 December 1941. Although almost every sea battle in World War II involved gunfire between surface warships to some degree, their time as the senior ship of a nation's fleet had run its course.

Those battleships belonging to the Central Powers that survived World War I often did not survive its aftermath. The German High Seas Fleet was scuttled at Scapa Flow by its sailors in June 1919 following their surrender and internment the previous November. On 1 November 1918, as the Austrian battleship  was being transferred to the State of Slovenes, Croats and Serbs, she was mined and sunk at Pola by two Italian frogmen,  and Raffaele Rossetti, who were unaware of the transfer. On 27 November 1942 the Vichy French government scuttled the majority of the French fleet at Toulon.

Sunk in combat

Converted battleships

Lost at sea

Scuttled battleships

Expended as targets

See also 
 List of sunken battlecruisers
 List of sunken aircraft carriers
 List of sunken nuclear submarines

Notes

Footnotes

Citations

References

Journals

Online resources

News publications

External links 
 USS Maine (Navy Historical Center)
 USS Maine Memorial at Arlington National Cemetery
 Gordon Smith, Naval-History.net

Sunken battleships
Battleships, Sunken